Abdul Halim Bangladesh Nationalist Party politician. He was elected member of parliament for Dinajpur-4 in February 1996.

Career 
Abdul is a lawyer and a member of Dinajpur district BNP. He was elected to parliament from Dinajpur-4 as a Bangladesh Nationalist Party candidate in 15 February 1996 Bangladeshi general election. He was defeated from Dinajpur-4 constituency on 12 June 1996 on the nomination of Bangladesh Nationalist Party.

References 

Possibly living people
Year of birth missing (living people)
People from Dinajpur District, Bangladesh
Bangladesh Nationalist Party politicians
6th Jatiya Sangsad members